Marcelo Ariel Morales Suárez (born 6 June 2003) is a Chilean professional footballer who plays as a left-back for Chilean Primera División side Universidad de Chile.

Club career
In 2011, Morales came to Universidad de Chile at under-8 level and made his professional debut at the age of 17 in a Primera División match against Universidad de Concepción on October 29, 2020. At international level, he made his debut in a 2021 Copa Libertadores match against San Lorenzo played in Argentina on March 18, 2021.

International career
In December 2021, he represented Chile U20 at the friendly tournament Copa Rául Coloma Rivas, playing three matches, and at the friendly match versus Peru U20 in 12 July 2022. In 2023, he made two appearances in the South American U20 Championship.

He represented Chile at under-23 level in a 1–0 win against Peru U23 on 31 August 2022, in the context of preparations for the 2023 Pan American Games.

References

External links
 
 Marcelo Morales at playmakerstats.com (English version of ceroacero.es)

Living people
2003 births
Chilean footballers
Chile under-20 international footballers
Association football defenders
Universidad de Chile footballers
Chilean Primera División players
Place of birth missing (living people)